Luelen Bernart (Pohnpei 1866-1946) was the first Micronesian to write a book and Pohnpei's first historian. He is the author of  The Book of Luelen.

References

1866 births
1946 deaths
Federated States of Micronesia writers
Federated States of Micronesia historians
20th-century historians
20th-century male writers